Epsilon Aquilae, Latinized from ε Aquilae, is the Bayer designation for a binary star system in the equatorial constellation of Aquila, near the western constellation boundary with Hercules. It has an apparent visual magnitude of 4.02 and is visible to the naked eye.

It has the traditional name Deneb el Okab , from an Arabic term ذنب العقاب ðanab al-ʽuqāb "the tail of the eagle", and the Mandarin names Woo  and Yuë , derived from and represent the state  Wú (吳),  an old state was located at the mouth of the Yangtze River, and  Yuè (越), an old state in Zhejiang province (together with 19 Capricorni in Twelve States asterism). According to the R.H. Allen's works, it shares names with ζ Aquilae. Epsilon Aquilae is more precisely called Deneb el Okab Borealis, because is situated to the north of Zeta Aquilae, which can therefore be called Deneb el Okab Australis.

The binary nature of this system was reported by German astronomer F. Kustner in 1914, but it was not confirmed until 1974. It is a single-lined spectroscopic binary system; the pair orbit each other over a period of 1,271 days (3.5 years) with an eccentricity (ovalness) of 0.27. There are two visual companions to Epsilon Aquilae, both reported by German astronomer R. Engelmann in 1887. Component B is a magnitude 10.56 star at an angular separation of  along a position angle (PA) of 184° relative to the primary, as of 2014.

The primary component of this system is an evolved giant star with a stellar classification of K1-IIICN0.5, showing a mild overabundance of the CN molecule in the spectrum. The chemical abundances of the star suggest it has gone through first dredge-up. It has more than double the mass of the Sun and has expanded to ten times the Sun's radius. The star shines with 54–fold the Sun's luminosity, which is being radiated from its outer envelope at an effective temperature of 4,760 K. At this heat, it glows with the orange-hue of a K-type star. This has been designated a barium star, meaning its atmosphere is extremely enriched with barium and other heavy elements. However, this is disputed, with astronomer Andrew McWilliam (1990) finding normal abundances from an s-process.

References

External links 
 Deneb el Okab Borealis by Jim Kaler
 Image Epsilon Aquilae

K-type giants
Barium stars
Astrometric binaries
Spectroscopic binaries
Deneb el Okab
Aquila (constellation)
Aquilae, Epsilon
BD+14 3736
Aquilae, 13
176411
093244
7176